Scamander is a river god in Greek mythology.

Scamander may also refer to:

 Scamander, Tasmania, a small town at the mouth of the Scamander River on Tasmania's north east coast
 Karamenderes River in Asia Minor, previously called the Scamander River
 Newt Scamander, the pseudonym used by J. K. Rowling when she wrote Fantastic Beasts and Where to Find Them, as well as a character in its adaptations
 Scamander (king of Boeotia), a mythical Greek king

See also
Skamander, a Polish group of experimental poets